Swing Low, also known as Sam Cooke, is the sixth studio album by American singer-songwriter Sam Cooke. Produced by Hugo & Luigi, the album was released in February 1961 in the United States by RCA Victor. The album includes the hit single "Chain Gang".

The album was remastered in 2011 as a part of The RCA Albums Collection.

Track listing

Side one 
 "Swing Low, Sweet Chariot" (Traditional) – 3:05
 "I'm Just a Country Boy" (Fred Hellerman, Marshall Barer) – 4:05
 "They Call the Wind Maria" (Alan Jay Lerner, Frederick Loewe) – 2:54
 "Twilight on the Trail" (Sidney D. Mitchell, Louis Alter) – 3:10
 "If I Had You" (Sam Cooke, James W. Alexander) – 2:20
 "Chain Gang" (Cooke) – 2:32

Side two
 "Grandfather's Clock" (Henry Clay Work) – 3:10
 "Jeanie with the Light Brown Hair" (Stephen Foster) – 3:44
 "Long, Long Ago" (Thomas Haynes Bayly) – 3:00
 "Pray" (Johnnie Taylor) – 2:10
 "You Belong to Me" (Cooke, Alexander) – 2:44
 "Goin' Home" (Antonín Dvořák, Williams Arms Fisher) – 3:05

Personnel
All credits adapted from The RCA Albums Collection (2011) liner notes. The musicians who recorded "Chain Gang", save for Cooke, Clifton White, George Barnes and Glenn Osser, are unknown.
Sam Cooke – vocals
Clifton White, Don Arnone, Everett Barksdale, Al Chernet, George Barnes (on "Chain Gang") – guitar
Milt Hinton – bass guitar
Jimmy Crawford, Bunny Shawker – drums
Hank Jones – piano
Seldon Powell – saxophone
Hinda Barnett, Fred Fradkin, Archie Levin, Harry Lookofsky, Ben Miller, David Nadien, Sylvan Shulman – violin
George Ricci – cello
Al Brown – viola
Steve Lipkins, Leon Marian – trumpet
Henderson Chambers, Albert Godlis, Frank Saracco – trombone
Sammy Lowe – conductor 
Glenn Osser – conductor on "Chain Gang”
Bob Simpson – recording engineer

Notes

External links 
 Songs of Sam Cooke: Main Page

1960 albums
Sam Cooke albums
Albums conducted by Glenn Osser
Albums conducted by Sammy Lowe
Albums produced by Hugo & Luigi
RCA Victor albums